Penwell may refer to:

 Penwell, New Jersey
 Penwell, Texas

See also
 Bonnell (microarchitecture)#Penwell, microprocessor architecture
 Guy Penwell, basketball coach
 PennWell, an American publishing company
 Pennewill, a surname